Cesare Bonetti (10 March 1888 – 14 May 1956) was an Italian weightlifter. He competed in the men's lightweight event at the 1924 Summer Olympics.

References

External links
 

1888 births
1956 deaths
Italian male weightlifters
Olympic weightlifters of Italy
Weightlifters at the 1924 Summer Olympics
People from Fiorenzuola d'Arda
Sportspeople from the Province of Piacenza
20th-century Italian people